Markus Pajur (born 23 September 2000) is an Estonian cyclist, who currently rides for UCI ProTeam .

Major results
2018
 3rd Road race, National Junior Road Championships
2019
 6th Memorial Grundmanna I Wizowskiego
 9th Memoriał Henryka Łasaka
2020
 2nd Puchar Ministra Obrony Narodowej
 3rd Time trial, National Road Championships
 4th Road race, European Under-23 Road Championships
 6th Carpathian Couriers Race
 9th Overall Baltic Chain Tour

References

External links

2000 births
Living people
Estonian male cyclists
People from Kiili Parish